The women's marathon at the 2013 World Championships in Athletics was held at the Luzhniki Stadium and Moscow streets on 10 August.

The first event of these World Championships started under hot and humid conditions at 2 in the afternoon.  The race was dominated by the front running of 37-year-old Italian Valeria Straneo, leading at every split point.  Like the 2012 Olympics, this did not look like the day for defending champion Edna Kiplagat, by 10K she had already dropped almost 30 seconds off the pace set by a large pack of leaders.  By 15K, Kiplagat had joined the pack of 7 leaders, which also included Jia Chaofeng, Lucy Wangui Kabuu, Valentine Jepkorir Kipketer, Meselech Melkamu, Feyse Tadese and Kayoko Fukushi with the rest of the field being single or double marathoners, without any chase group.  The pack lost individuals, Jia was the first to exit, followed by Tadese, Kipketer and Kabuu.  By the time Fukushi lost some ground, the closest remaining chaser was her teammate Ryoko Kizaki over a minute back.  When Melkamu left, she left quickly leaving a two-woman race to the finish.  In the shadow of the stadium, Kiplagat pulled away from Straneo through the Olympic Park to a 14-second victory, Fukushi about 2 minutes back to get the bronze.  Kiplagat is the first woman to repeat as champion in the marathon.

Records
Prior to the competition, the records were as follows:

Qualification standards

Schedule

Results

Final
The race was started at 14:00.

References

External links

Marathon results at IAAF website

marathon
Marathons at the World Athletics Championships
World Championships Women
2013 in women's athletics
Marathons in Russia
Women's marathons